Work Weather Wife (Gurmukhi: ਵਰਕ ਵੇਦਰ ਵਾਈਫ, Devanagari: वोर्क वेदेर वाईफ़) is a Canadian Punjabi feature film starring Harpreet Sandhu and Reema Nagra in the lead role with Dilbag Brar and Kirat Bhattal and is directed by Harpreet Sandhu.

The film had two songs, "Moon" and "Long Braid" in consideration for a nomination for Academy Award for Best Original Song prior to the 87th Academy Awards. At the 72nd Golden Globe Awards for Best Foreign Language Feature Film, Work Weather Wife was one of 53 films approved for consideration in the Foreign Language category.

Plot
Vick tricks his way into Dimple and CJ's fragile family. The film outlines the major community issue of honour killings. CJ, who belongs to the working class, doesn't have time for the daily household routine, and Vick outsmarts CJ on a scam.

Cast
 Harpreet Sandhu  as Vick, an NRI living in Vancouver, BC
 Reema Nagra as Dimple, an NRI living in Vancouver, BC
 Dilbag Brar as CJ, Dimple's husband
 B K Singh Rakhra as Vick's father
 Mani Kahlon as Bobby, Vick's friend
 Eline Mets as Amber
 Abi Centrik as Boy
 Kirat Bhattal as Gugni, CJ's daughter
 Jagmohan Bhandari as Psychiatrist
 Monsoon Sondhi as Vick's sister
 Sukhi Waraich as Vick's sister's boyfriend
 Alicia Karl as Monique
Deepika Singh as Kashish

Soundtrack

The soundtrack features ten songs composed by Harpreet Sandhu, Dilbag Brar and Sukhjinder Alfaaz with lyrics by Dilbag Brar and Sukhjinder Alfaaz and voice rendered by Alka Yagnik, Arsh Avtar, Sukhjinder Alfaaz, Dilbag Brar, and Urdu poetry by Harpreet Sandhu.

References

External links 
 WORK WEATHER WIFE FACEBOOK PAGE
 

2014 films
Indian drama films
2010s Punjabi-language films
Films about Indian Canadians
Canadian drama films
2014 soundtrack albums
2010s Canadian films